The Darkest Red is an album from The Agony Scene that was released under Roadrunner Records in 2005. The song "Prey" was included on the 2005 game Infected, released on the PSP. The video for "Prey" was included as one of three bonus videos on the game.

Track listing

Personnel
The Agony Scene
Mike Williams – vocals
Chris Emmons – lead guitar
Steven Kaye – rhythm guitar
Brian Hodges – bass
Brent Masters – drums

Additional
Rob Caggiano – production, engineer, mixing, additional guitar
Paul Orafino – engineer, mixing
Michael Rich – mixing
Justin Borucki – photography
Mike Gitter – A&R

References

The Agony Scene albums
2005 albums
Roadrunner Records albums